The Hotel de Boysson-Cheverry is a mansion located at N° 11 rue Malcousinat, in the historic center of Toulouse. Built in the second half of the 15th century for an enriched merchant, Huc de Boysson, it was remodeled and considerably enlarged during the following century by another merchant Jean de Cheverry. It is a listed historical monument since 1928.

History
In 1458, a ruined house already belongs to Huc de Boysson, draper, woad merchant, but also a money changer, originally from Aubin and settled in Toulouse in 1432. The great fire of 7 May 1463 destroyed this house, like the other houses in the neighborhood. It is therefore probably between 1463 and 1468, when it becomes capitoul, that a new residence is built by Huc de Boysson, which thus marks his wealth and power.
In 1535, the hotel was acquired by Jean de Cheverry, a woad merchant. He is one of the influential personages of the time. In 1526 he married Jeanne de Lancefoc, who came from a large family of Capitouls. In 1548 he married his daughter Peyronne to Pierre d'Assézat, another woad merchant. Elected capitoul one month after the purchase of the hotel de Boysson, Jean de Cheverry seems to undertake new developments in a Renaissance style that corresponds to the fashion of the time. He had the windows of the tower modified and ordered the construction of four other buildings.

Description
The hotel retains elements representative of the Gothic style, especially for the parts built by Huc de Boysson, but also Renaissance elements, in the parts added by Jean de Cheverry.
In the first gothic courtyard, on the first floor of the tower a large Renaissance-style mullioned window was opened in 1535: the columns and the mullion were replaced by three caryatids and the pilasters are covered with arabesques.
The second courtyard was formerly the garden of Huc de Boysson, and on the east side of the courtyard, in the part which belongs to the Hotel de Boysson, there is a remarkable window: the Gothic frame is overloaded with scorching scrolls of Finely carved thistles. The arcaded gallery is supported by columns of stone Doric style. The doors and windows on the ground and two floors, decorated with columns and pilasters, are typical of the Renaissance. The lower room with its vault of sixteen ribs and a double ogive cross, with liernes and tiercerons, is remarkable.

Pictures

See also 
 Renaissance architecture of Toulouse

Bibliography 
 Guy Ahlsell de Toulza, Louis Peyrusse, Bruno Tollon, Hôtels et Demeures de Toulouse et du Midi Toulousain, Daniel Briand éditeur, Drémil Lafage, 1997

References

Houses completed in the 16th century
Buildings and structures in Toulouse
Renaissance architecture in Toulouse
Hôtels particuliers in Toulouse